Tirhuta Panchang (Devanagari: तिरहुता पंचांग, Tirhuta: 𑒞𑒱𑒩𑒯𑒳𑒞𑒰 𑒣𑓀𑒔𑒰𑓀𑒑, IPA: Tirhutā pan̄cāṅg) is a calendar followed by the Maithili community of India and Nepal. This calendar is one of the many Hindu calendars. It is a tropical solar Hindu calendar in which the year begins on the first day of Baishakh month i.e. Mesh Sankranti. Every year, this day falls on 13/14 April of the Gregorian Calendar

Months
Names of Maithili months :Maithili Calendar

Months and their corresponding season
तिरहुता पञ्चाङ्ग (Maithili calendar)

Baishakha-Jyeshtha-Asharha
These three months are the summer season in Mithila. Jeth and Asarh are very hot. Baisakh is the month of growing lychee. Jeth and Asarh are the months of growing mangoes.

Shrabana-Bhadra
Mithila receives heavy rainfall during these two months, often resulting in flooding. Farmers wait for the season's first rain so they can sow paddy in their fields. The holy month of Saon is devoted to Lord Shiva. Devotees visit Baidnath Dham in Deoghar to offer gangajal.

Ashvina-Kartika
These two months have moderate weather, and both represent the festive season for Mithila. Navaratra falls in Asin; Diwali and Chhath fall in Katik. Moreover, Katik is the harvesting month for farmers.

Margashirsha-Pausha-Magha
Margashirsha, Pausha and Magh are the winter seasons in Mithila. Out of these three, Pausha and Magh are the extreme winter periods, when the temperature sometimes falls to 5 °C. Makar Sankranti falls in the month of Pausha, and Basant Panchami in Magh.

Falguna-Chaitra
After winter, Falgun and Chaitra are the moderate months. Fagun and Chait again are the harvesting months. Holi falls in Fagun and Chhath falls in Chait. Chaith is the last month of the Maithili calendar.

Days in Maithili calendar
Like, most of the calendars of the world, Maithili calendar also has 7 days in a week, each of 24-hour length. Rabibasar or Sunday is supposed to be the first day of the week.
Rabibasar / Sunday : रविवासर
Somabasar / Monday : सोमवासर
Mangaldin / Tuesday : मंगलवासर 
Budhbasar / Wednesday: बुधवासर
Brihaspatibasar / Thursday : बृहस्पतीवासर
Shukrabasar / Friday: शुक्रवासर
Shanibasar / Saturday : शनिवासर

Significance
The Maithili calendar is  the calendar of Mithila which originated in Mithila region. The Maithili calendar is of great importance for Maithil people in India as well as in Nepal. All auspicious dates (e.g. marriage, Mundan, Upanayana sanskar) as well as the dates of Maithili festivals (e.g. Dipawali (Diwali/Tihar), Chhath, Durga Puja, Janaki Navami) are set based on the Maithili calendar. It has deep roots in the Hindu religion and Mithila's culture.

Related calendars
The Maithili calendar is related to the Hindu solar calendar, which is itself based on the Surya Siddhanta. The Hindu solar calendar also starts in mid-April, and the first day of the calendar is celebrated as the traditional New Year in the Indian states of Assam, West Bengal, Kerala, Manipur, Orissa, Punjab, Tamil Nadu, and Tripura. Bangladesh, Nepal, Thailand and Sri Lanka  also celebrate new year around the same time (13–15 April). This day is also known as Mesha Shankranti.

See also
 Mithila
 Tirhut
 Tirhuta script
 Maithili language
 Jur Sital (Maithili New Year)
 Muzaffarpur
 Vidyapati

References

External links 
 Online Tirhuta Panchang
 Tirhut- Tirhut=Mithila
 Maithili e-journal
 Maithil=Videha=Vajji=Tirhut
 Online Mithila shopping store

Culture of Mithila
Public holidays in India
Calendars
Hindu calendar
Mithila
Time in India